With Love is a Canadian thriller film, directed by Marc Bisaillon and released in 2018. Based on the 2006 murder spree of Stephen Marshall, the film stars Pierre-Luc Lafontaine as Alex, a young man who travels to Maine under the pretext of visiting his father (Paul Doucet), but is instead planning to use the state's sex offender registry to track down and murder sex offenders; meanwhile, his mother Rose (Fanny Mallette), having awareness of his intentions, travels to Maine to try to stop him.

The film premiered at the Festival du cinéma international en Abitibi-Témiscamingue in October 2018.

The film received three Canadian Screen Award nominations at the 7th Canadian Screen Awards in 2019, for Best Supporting Actor (Doucet), Best Original Screenplay (Bisaillon) and Best Overall Sound (Stéphane Barsalou and Bernard Gariépy Strobl).

References

External links
 

2018 films
Canadian thriller films
Quebec films
2018 thriller films
French-language Canadian films
2010s Canadian films